Storrington is an electoral division of West Sussex in the United Kingdom and returns one member to West Sussex County Council.

Extent
The division covers the villages of Amberley, Ashington, Greatham, North Stoke, Rackham, Storrington, Sullington, Washington, Wiggonholt and Wiston.

It comprises the following Horsham District wards: the southern part of Chanctonbury Ward, and Chantry Ward; and of the following civil parishes: Amberley, Ashington, Parham, Storrington & Sullington, Washington and Wiston.

On 21 July 2013 Frank Wilkinson died from cancer, this necessitated the holding of a bye-election, which was held on 26 September 2013

Election results

2013 Bye-election
Results of the bye-election held on 26 September 2013:

2013 Election
Results of the election held on 2 May 2013:

2009 Election
The latest election took place on 4 June 2009:

2005 Election
Results of the election held on 5 May 2005:

References

Election Results - West Sussex County Council

External links
 West Sussex County Council
 Election Maps

Electoral Divisions of West Sussex